The Battle of Thymbrara was the decisive battle in the war between Croesus of the Lydian Kingdom and Cyrus the Great of the Achaemenid Empire. Cyrus, after he had pursued Croesus into Lydia after the drawn Battle of Pteria, met the remains of Croesus' partially-disbanded army in battle on the plain north of Sardis in December 547 BC.  Croesus' army was about twice as large and had been reinforced with many new men, but Cyrus still utterly defeated it. That proved to be decisive, and after the 14-day Siege of Sardis, the city and possibly its king fell, and Lydia was conquered by the Persians.

Background

Cyrus conquered the Kingdom of Media in 550 BC, which created conflict with the neighboring Lydian Kingdom. Cyrus planned to catch the Lydian king unprepared for battle, but at Thymbrara, Croesus had more than twice as many men as Cyrus. The Lydians marched out to meet Cyrus and quickly armed all the reserves there before their allies could arrive, which they never did. According to Xenophon, Cyrus had 196,000 men in total,  which was composed of 31,000 to 70,000 Persians. That consisted of 20,000 infantry, which may have included archers and slingers; 10,000 elite infantry/ cavalry, which may have been the Persian Immortals; and 20,000 peltasts and 20,000 pikemen. All except the archers and slingers are known to have carried small to large shields. The others were 42,000 Arabians; Armenians; and Medians, which amounted to 126,000 infantry. There were also 300 camel cavalry, 300 chariots, and 5-6 siege towers, which were known to hold 20 men each. It all amounted to more than 1,000 men, partly because there was one citizen, and one soldier on each chariot.  

Xenophon tells us that Croesus had an army of 420,000 men, which was composed of 60,000 Babylonians, Lydians, and Phrygians, also Cappadocians, plus nations of the Hellespont. This amounted to 300,000 men which included 60,000 cavalries. There were also 120,000 Egyptians, plus 300 chariots, which may have been at least 500 men. The numbers of the battle given by Xenophon, even if untrue, are considered within the realm of possibility, but less than half may have engaged in the actual battle.

Battle

Cyrus deployed his troops with flanks withdrawn in a square formation. The flanks were covered by chariots, cavalry, and infantry. Cyrus also used baggage camels to create a barrier around his archers. The smell of the camels disrupted the Lydian horses and scattered their cavalry charge as the archers fired upon Lydian forces.

As Cyrus had expected, the wings of the Lydian army wheeled inward to envelop this novel formation. As the Lydian flanks swung in, gaps appeared at the hinges of the wheeling wings. The disorder was increased by the effective overhead fire of the Persian archers and mobile towers, stationed within the square. Cyrus then gave the order to attack, and his flank units smashed into Croesus' disorganized wings. Soon, the Lydian cavalry lost many soldiers and was forced to retreat. With most of Cyrus' army intact and the loss of most of the Lydian cavalry, Cyrus ordered all cavalry and infantry to attack what remained of Croesus' forces. Most of the infantry soon surrendered, but Croesus and a small part of the infantry retreated and headed for the Lydian capital of Sardis, which resulted in a decisive victory for the Persians.

Herodotus gives an account of the battle but does not give any numbers. His account of the battle's progress and outcome, however, confirms what Xenophon gives later.

Aftermath

After the battle, the Lydians were driven within the walls of Sardis and put to siege by the victorious Cyrus. The city fell after the 14-day Siege of Sardis, reportedly by the Lydians' failure to garrison a part of the wall that they had thought to be unsusceptible to attack because of the steepness of the adjacent declivity of the ground. Croesus was captured, and his territory, including the Greek cities of Ionia and Aeolis, was incorporated into Cyrus' already-powerful empire.

That development brought Greece and Persia into conflict and culminated in the celebrated Persian wars of Cyrus' successors. Along with acquiring Ionia and Aeolis, Cyrus also had the Egyptian soldiers, who fought on behalf of the Lydians, voluntarily surrender and join his army. 

According to the Greek author Herodotus, Cyrus treated Croesus well and with respect after the battle. The Babylonian Nabonidus Chronicle apparently contradicts that by reporting that Cyrus defeated and killed the king, but the identity of the Lydian king is unclear.

See also
Siege of Sardis (546 BC)

References

Sources
 Davis, Paul K. (1999). 100 Decisive Battles: From Ancient Times to the Present, Santa Barbara, CA, USA:PUBLISHER, URL.
 Campbell, Alexander (1830). The Millennial Harbinger, Vol. I, No. IX.
 Grant, R.G. (2005). Battle: a Visual Journey Through 5000 Years of Combat, DK Publishing London,

547 BC
Thymbrara
Thymbrara
6th century BC
Thymbrara